Binoy Viswam is a Member of Parliament (Rajya Sabha) from Kerala representing the Communist Party of India (CPI). He is the National Secretary of CPI and Working President of the All India Trade Union Congress. He was the Forest Minister in the Government of Kerala during 2006–2011. He was earlier elected to the Kerala Legislative Assembly from Nadapuram constituency and served as Member, Estimates Committee; Chairman, Assurance Committee; and was one of the five members of the Constituency Delimitation Committee. He is a senior Communist Party of India (CPI) leader and the president of the Kerala Tourism Development Corporation Employees' Federation.

Political career
He entered politics from his school days through All India Students Federation (AISF), as Unit Secretary of AISF in Vaikom Government Boys High School. He also elected as Union Chairman of St. Paul's College, Kalamassery. He was elected as Member of Kerala University Union and Syndicate member of Cochin University of Science and Technology. Later he became State President and All India Secretary of AISF.
He also was elected as State Secretary of All India Youth Federation (AIYF). He served as Vice President of World Federation of Democratic Youth (WFDY) and also Head of its Asia Pacific Commission.
He became a CPI member at the age of 18. He was Member of National Council of CPI during the period 1992–98.
He also served as Kerala Agricultural University Senate Member and Director Board Member of KTDC.

He won "Ambassador of Friendship Among World Youth Award" instituted by the Young Communist League of the Soviet Union.
He also received "Banner of Youth Unity" and diploma awarded by the World Youth Federation.

Personal life

Binoy is married to Shaila. Shaila worked in the Kerala Gramin Bank as officer at Thiruvananthapuram, Kerala, India. Shaila completed a course from Nottingham University in creative writing. Both Binoy Viswam and Shaila are the children of two prominent Communist Party leaders.
 Binoy Viswam is the son of C.K.Viswanathan who was a leader of the Communist Party of India. He was the Asst Secretary of its State Committee and is a well-known campaigner and strategist. Shaila is the daughter of Koothattukulam Mary, a party leader turned teacher.

The couple have two daughters, Rasmi & Surya. Rasmi is working in The Hindu. Surya is a law graduate from Columbia University and is practicing at the High Court of Kerala, Ernakulam.

See also
 Kerala Council of Ministers

References

External links

Facebook

Malayali politicians
Living people
Politicians from Kozhikode
Members of the Kerala Legislative Assembly
Communist Party of India politicians from Kerala
1948 births